Constantine Diogenes was a prominent early 11th-century Byzantine general. 

Constantine Diogenes may also refer to:

 Constantine Diogenes (son of Romanos IV) (died 1073), grandson of the general
 Constantine Diogenes (pretender), impostor pretender to the Byzantine throne